Miraculin is a taste modifier, a glycoprotein extracted from the fruit of Synsepalum dulcificum. The berry, also known as the miracle fruit, was documented by explorer Chevalier des Marchais, who searched for many different fruits during a 1725 excursion to its native West Africa.

Miraculin itself does not taste sweet. When taste buds are exposed to miraculin, the protein binds to the sweetness receptors. This causes normally sour-tasting acidic foods, such as citrus, to be perceived as sweet. The effect can last for one or two hours.

History
The sweetening properties of Synsepalum dulcificum berries were first noted by des Marchais during expeditions to West Africa in the 18th century. The term miraculin derived from experiments to isolate and purify the active glycoprotein that gave the berries their sweetening effects, results that were published simultaneously by Japanese and Dutch scientists working independently in the 1960s (the Dutch team called the glycoprotein mieraculin). The word miraculin was in common use by the mid-1970s.

Glycoprotein structure 

Miraculin was first sequenced in 1989 and was found to be a 24.6 kilodalton glycoprotein consisting of 191 amino acids and 13.9% by weight of various sugars.

The sugars consist of a total of 3.4 kDa, composed of a molar ratio of glucosamine (31%), mannose (30%), fucose (22%), xylose (10%), and galactose (7%).

The native state of miraculin is a tetramer consisting of two dimers, each held together by a disulfide bridge. Both tetramer miraculin and native dimer miraculin in its crude state have the taste-modifying activity of turning sour tastes into sweet tastes. Miraculin belongs to the Kunitz STI protease inhibitor family.

Sweetness properties 

Miraculin, unlike curculin (another taste-modifying agent), is not sweet by itself, but it can change the perception of sourness to sweetness, even for a long period after consumption. The duration and intensity of the sweetness-modifying effect depends on various factors, such as miraculin concentration, duration of contact of the miraculin with the tongue, and acid concentration. Miraculin reaches its maximum sweetness with a solution containing at least 4*10−7 mol/L miraculin, which is held in the mouth for about 3 minutes. Maximum is equivalent in sweetness to a 0.4 mol/L solution of sucrose. Miraculin degrades permanently via denaturation at high temperatures, at pH below 3 or above 12.

Although the detailed mechanism of the taste-inducing behavior is unknown, it appears the sweet receptors are activated by acids which are related to sourness, an effect remaining until the taste buds perceive a neutral pH. Sweeteners are perceived by the human sweet taste receptor, hT1R2-hT1R3, which belongs to G protein-coupled receptors, modified by the two histidine residues (i.e. His30 and His60) which participate in the taste-modifying behavior. One site maintains the attachment of the protein to the membranes while the other (with attached xylose or arabinose) activates the sweet receptor membrane in acid solutions.

As a sweetener 

As miraculin is a readily soluble protein and relatively heat stable, it is a potential sweetener in acidic food (e.g. soft drinks). While attempts to express it in yeast and tobacco plants have failed, researchers have succeeded in preparing genetically modified E. coli bacteria, lettuce and tomatoes that express miraculin. The scientists' crops resulted in 40 micrograms of miraculin per gram of lettuce leaves, with two grams of lettuce leaves producing roughly the same amount of miraculin as in one miracle fruit berry.

The use of miraculin as a food additive was forbidden in 1974 by the United States Food and Drug Administration, in circumstances that have been interpreted as suggesting influence by competing commercial interests. Since 2011, The FDA has imposed a ban on importing Synsepalum dulcificum (specifying 'miraculin') from its origin in Taiwan, declaring it as an "illegal undeclared sweetener". Although this ban does not apply to fresh and freeze-dried miracle fruit, the fresh or normally-frozen berry deteriorates rapidly. The ban also does not apply to sale as a dietary supplement.  There is informed opinion that the FDA ban could be overturned given sufficient funding for the required safety studies. Miraculin has a novel food status in the European Union. It is approved in Japan as a safe food additive, according to the List of Existing Food Additives published by the Ministry of Health and Welfare (published by JETRO).

See also 
 Brazzein
 Curculin
 Monellin
 Thaumatin
 Pentadin
 Cynarin
Stevia

References 

Taste modifiers
Sugar substitutes
Food science
Biomolecules
Chemopreventive agents